"Die Another Day" is the theme song from the James Bond film of the same name by American singer and songwriter Madonna. The song initially leaked onto the internet in early October 2002 prior to the official release, prompting radio to play the track. It was released commercially as a single on October 22 by Maverick Records. The single was then included on her ninth studio album American Life (2003) as well as on her greatest hits compilation, Celebration (2009). Following the release of the previous Bond single, "The World Is Not Enough", MGM wanted a high-profile artist for the theme of Die Another Day, and Madonna was their choice. She wrote and produced the song with Mirwais Ahmadzaï while French composer Michel Colombier was enlisted as composer.

While developing, the track went through numerous changes. After Madonna saw the initial version of the film she adapted the song to its theme, described as a metaphor for destroying one's ego. Ahmadzaï re-arranged "Die Another Day" at his home in Paris while Colombier finished the string sections in Los Angeles. An electroclash and dance-pop number, "Die Another Day" is a mixture of strings and interpolating electronic swirls, and stuttered editing on Madonna's voice, cutting the main signal on the chorus.

"Die Another Day" received mixed responses from music critics; one group of reviewers favored its departure from traditional Bond soundtracks, while others panned its production and called it uninteresting. It was nominated for a Golden Globe Award for Best Original Song and two Grammy Awards for Best Dance Recording and Best Short Form Music Video. The song was a commercial success, peaking at number eight on the US Billboard Hot 100 and was the top selling dance song in the US for both 2002 and 2003. "Die Another Day" topped the charts in Canada, Italy, Panama, Portugal, Romania, Spain and Uruguay; and reached the top-ten in a number of countries worldwide.

The music video was directed by Traktor, and was developed as an independent video from the film but contained Bond influences. It depicts Madonna as a prisoner in a torture chamber, alternating with scenes of a fencing duel between good (clad in white) and evil (clad in black) personas of the singer. Wounds inflicted on both fencers are mirrored on the imprisoned Madonna, and in the end she escapes being electrocuted in the chamber. The usage of Jewish religious texts and objects in the music video led to controversy, with scholars of Judaism deeming it sacrilegious. Madonna has included the song on two of her world tours; the first being the 2004 Re-Invention World Tour and again as a video interlude on the 2008–09 Sticky & Sweet Tour.

Background and conception
After the September 11 attacks, Madonna was in an introspective mood and started writing songs for her next studio album, American Life, with producer Mirwais Ahmadzaï. Recording started in late 2001 but was put on hold as Madonna shot for her film Swept Away in Malta, and also starred in the West End play Up For Grabs. In the meantime, Metro-Goldwyn-Mayer (MGM) was filming the twentieth James Bond film, Die Another Day, directed by Lee Tamahori. The previous film in the franchise, The World Is Not Enough (1999) was a box office success earning US$362 million worldwide. However, the eponymous soundtrack single by alternative rock group Garbage failed to gain commercial success in the United States. The music management at MGM went to look for a high-profile artist to write and perform the title song for Die Another Day.

Madonna was their first choice, since she had been successful with soundtrack singles in the US, most recently with "Beautiful Stranger" (1999) from Austin Powers: The Spy Who Shagged Me which was a top-twenty hit and earned her a Grammy Award for Best Song Written for Visual Media. Anita Camrata, executive vice president of MGM Music explained the choice in 2002: "With every other artist, you're taking a chance. But with Madonna, she has an extraordinary track record. She has written songs for films before and they were always perfect." By mid-February 2002 sources from the film set revealed that negotiations were under process for Madonna to sing the title song and make a cameo appearance in Die Another Day. The song deal was confirmed in mid-March with journalists reporting a complex contract which might have cost MGM around one million dollars, including Madonna's fees for music and acting, promotion, the single release and the music video. "Die Another Day" was officially released in United States on October 22, 2002. It was supposed to be released on October 10, but got leaked a week prior to that to the radio stations. Website Hollywood.com reported that "Madonna and members of her camp were beside themselves when the song—which they claim wasn't even finished—aired on a pop station in New York City."

Writing and development

According to MTV News, work began on the song following the announcement, with French composer Michel Colombier being confirmed as the strings conductor. Colombier had worked with Madonna and Ahmadzaï on her single "Don't Tell Me" from Music. Madonna and Ahmadzaï went through their demo tracks for American Life and zeroed on one of the songs for the film. They sent the demo to MGM describing it as "this techno thing, an electronica piece rewritten to accommodate the film and the title". According to Colombier, the studio responded positively to the demo but wanted them to change it so that it blended with traditional James Bond music in some way.

The track went through various interpolations, according to executive producer of the film, Michael G. Wilson. Madonna's publicist Liz Rosenberg had initially confirmed that the title of the song might not be same as the film, however Wilson explained that when the singer "saw the rough [film] we were going to use, she sort of adapted the song and changed the title to 'Die Another Day'." Tamahori was concerned with the demo since it did not appear expressive to him and there were abrupt endings. However he was satisfied when Madonna re-wrote the chorus to make it suitable for the film. The writing process was explained by Madonna:
I hemmed and hawed about it for a while because just for that reason though. Everybody wants to do the theme song of a James Bond movie, and I never liked to do what everybody else likes to do. It's just some perverse thing in me, right? So, but then I thought about it and I said, you know what? James Bond needs to get – needs to get techno so...
Used in the opening sequence, "Die Another Day" was played 13 minutes into the film, where Bond is shown imprisoned and being tortured for over a year in a prison camp in Korea. Being a departure from the normal title sequence of the previous Bond films, Madonna faced difficulty in making the song blend with the theme of Die Another Day. Nevertheless, she understood the idea behind the opening scenes and tweaked the song accordingly. Some of the lyrics like "I'm gonna destroy my ego ... Sigmund Freud ... Analyze this" were derived from Madonna's interpretation of the film's storyline. She told an interviewer from Genre magazine that the lyrics were about "destroying your ego, and it's juxtaposing the metaphor of, you know, the fight against good and bad, and it's set inside the whole universe of Bond". "Die Another Day" was never adapted into the main score of the film. The song was later added to the track list of American Life and was also featured on her third greatest hits album, Celebration (2009).

Recording and composition
Once the song structure was finished, MGM sent Colombier in Los Angeles a rough edit of the opening sequence of the film, while Ahmadzaï sent him a longer version of the demo. Colombier had to create something inline the film score with "Die Another Day". He added some more lyrics and then went to London to conduct an ensemble of 60 string players at AIR Lyndhurst Studios. Ahmadzaï, who was already mixing and recording the other tracks for American Life, explained that the process "was often laborious but with a less-is-more philosophy that is reflected in the music's sparse arrangements." They wanted minimalist production for the song, but at the same time make them sound "futuristic".

After the orchestra sections were done, Ahmadzaï took the track back to his home in Paris and did a complete re-arrangement. String engineer Geoff Foster recalled that Madonna wanted something "big and brass" which Ahmadzaï denied, since Madonna had already done that with her 1998 single, "Frozen". Colombier explained that the final version was not the way he had structured the song, it was according to Ahmadzaï's mixing and ideas. "He's a master manipulator. Sixty real strings, played live, became audio files in his computer. They can be chopped like real pieces of fabric. He's amazingly brilliant with that," concluded Colombier. Madonna attended the recording sessions at Olympic Studios in London. There was a tango section in the song which Colombier recalled was composed perfectly during rehearsals. But during the actual recording it did not work out as expected, prompting Madonna to grab the talkback mic and telling the crew, "It's not sexy enough, think about sex!"

"Die Another Day" is an electroclash and dance-pop number, starting with strings which continues for eleven seconds, when Madonna's vocals starts with the lines "I'm gonna keep this secret / I'm gonna close my body now..." It follows with the stuttered editing on her voice, which keeps cutting the main signal, especially on the chorus "I guess.. I would die... another day". The strings again gain prominence at around the 2:20 mark. During the intermediate verse, a "raucous" laugh by Madonna can be heard. The song ends with interpolating electronic swirls and the orchestra fading out. Sterling Clover from The Village Voice explained that the ending recalled the snare drums and bass usage in songs of the microhouse genre, describing it as "cacophony of harmonic fragments". According to the sheet music published at Musicnotes.com, the song is set in the time signature of common time with a fast tempo of 130 beats per minute. It is composed in the key of E major with Madonna's voice spanning from the notes B3 to D5.

Critical reception

The song received mixed reviews from music critics. Author Lucy O'Brien wrote in her biography, Madonna: Like an Icon, that the techno composition and the stuttering vocals made it "an almost anti-Bond theme". James Hannaham from Spin was positive in his review, writing that it is a "brilliant, melodramatic song, that sounds like a stoic response to a world gone mad." Writing for Yahoo! Music, Dan Gennoe felt that since the songs in American Life mostly gave prominence to style over substance, "Die Another Day" as a result had become one-dimensional. Stylus Magazines Ed Howard described the song as "a great slice-and-dice hit of fucked-up electroclash", in an otherwise negative review for American Life. Sal Cinquemani from Slant Magazine considered it "forward-thinking" and believed that the record was added to American Lifes track list to ensure that the album would not be devoid of a hit song. In August 2018, the same author placed it at number 51 on his ranking of the singer's singles, calling it "innovative, frustratingly anticlimactic —the aural equivalent of edging— and, perhaps fittingly, the last in Madonna’s long string of soundtrack hits". Clover described the track as "A blistering zeitgeist-negation, hostile and uneasy—as a single, a club track, a Bond theme." Chuck Taylor from Billboard was positive in his response, saying that the electronic effects rendered Madonna's vocals as non-discernible but the composition was forward thinking from Music (2000), her eighth studio album. Medium's Richard LaBeau panned the track as "overproduced and lyrically nonsensical [...] it assuredly ranks toward the bottom of any list of Bond themes and Madonna singles".

In his book Madonna: The Complete Guide to Her Music, author Rikky Rooksby described it as "melodically uninteresting and harmonically repetitious". He felt that the stuttered editing by Ahmadzai did not allow the song to gain its full potential but complimented the strings and the chords. Rooksby concluded by saying that "Die Another Day" reveals much about the decline in songwriting quality from the early Bond songs and was not much of an improvement over "The World Is Not Enough"; he said that the Sigmund Freud line was the "wittiest line" on the whole of American Life album. Writing for The A.V. Club, Stephen Thompson called the track "pneumatic" and "hook-deficient". Ken Tucker from Entertainment Weekly criticized the song as a "flat James Bond tune" adding that it failed to become a "Madonna classic". Both Manohla Dargis from Los Angeles Times and Joe Morgenstern from The Wall Street Journal panned the song calling it "dumb". Varietys Todd McCarthy called the song "banal". Also negative was The Guardians Jude Rogers, who wrote that "the 2002 Bond theme aimed for a sound of icy, imperial tyranny. Instead, its cut-up electronics sounded half-dead". A. O. Scott from The New York Times described Madonna's vocals as "electronically enhanced chirps" while reviewing Die Another Day.

The song was nominated for a Golden Globe award for Best Original Song, but lost to U2's "The Hands That Built America" from Gangs of New York. At the 46th Annual Grammy Awards, it was nominated in the categories of Best Dance Recording and Best Short Form Music Video, but lost both awards; the former to Kylie Minogue's "Come into My World" and the latter to Johnny Cash's "Hurt". "Die Another Day" was also nominated for a Golden Raspberry Award for Worst Original Song of 2002 while Madonna herself won the trophy of Worst Supporting Actress for her cameo in the film. In a 2006 MORI poll for the Channel 4 TV show James Bond's Greatest Hits, the song was voted the ninth best out of 22, but also came in as an "overwhelming number one" favorite among those under the age of 24. Rock music critic Neil McCormick from The Daily Telegraph named it the fifth best James Bond theme song, describing "Die Another Day" as an electro R&B workout which was "expressively weird, brutally modern, satisfyingly original and evocative of the dark heart of Bond. Plus, Madonna actually looks as if she might be a match for Bond in either bed or battlefield. Or both." Rolling Stone listed it as the seventh best Bond song in the magazine's 2012 list of "The top 10 James Bond Theme Songs".

Chart performance

After its release to radio in United States, "Die Another Day" started receiving strong airplay at the major US radio stations, having been spun for more than 100 times. The song garnered 35 million audience impressions in its first week, debuting at number 41 on the Billboard Hot 100, the highest debut of the year at that point. It also debuted at number 19 on the Mainstream Top 40, number 40 on the Adult Top 40 and number 42 on the Hot 100 Airplay charts. The next week the song continued its ascent up the airplay charts, while reaching number 28 on the Hot 100 and becoming the "breakout" track on the Hot Dance Music/Club Play chart. The release of the CD single on October 22, 2002, prompted the song to jump from position 18 to number eight on the Hot 100, thus becoming Madonna's 35th top-ten single on the chart. This feat put her ahead of The Beatles' 34 top-ten hits and one behind tying Elvis Presley's record as the artist with the most top-ten singles on the Hot 100. The move was spurred by sales of 28,500 units of the CD which also put it on the top of Hot 100 Singles, becoming her third number one on that chart.

"Die Another Day" was the highest charting James Bond song in the US since Duran Duran's number-one single, "A View to Kill" (1985). It was also Madonna's highest-charting song since "Don't Tell Me" peaked at number four in February 2001, and was her 44th top-forty single—the most for any artist—breaking the tie with Aretha Franklin's 43 entries. The single spent 11 weeks at number one on Hot 100 Singles, becoming her most successful entry on that chart. "Die Another Day" became the best selling dance single of both 2002 and 2003 and the fifth best-selling dance single of the 2000s decade in the US. Additionally, Billboard also declared "Die Another Day" as Madonna's 33rd most successful single on the Hot 100. According to Nielsen SoundScan, the song has sold 232,000 digital downloads as of February 2013, making it one of her best selling titles released before 2005, the year when downloads began contributing into calculating the ranks on Billboard Hot 100, and one of the top ten best-selling James Bond tracks by digital purchased.

In Canada, the song debuted at number 25 on the Canadian Singles Chart, and ultimately reached the top, staying there for four weeks. The song was certified double platinum by the Music Canada (MC) for shipment of 200,000 copies. In Australia, the song debuted and peaked at number five on the Australian Singles Chart, staying for a total of 19 weeks and obtaining a gold from the Australian Recording Industry Association (ARIA) for shipment of 35,000 copies of the single. It was less successful in New Zealand, where it debuted and peaked at number 22 on the RIANZ Singles Chart, staying for a total of three weeks.

In the United Kingdom, "Die Another Day" entered the UK Singles Chart at number three on November 3, 2002 with 52,500 copies, being kept from the top spot by DJ Sammy's remix of Bryan Adams' 1985 single, "Heaven", and the song "Dilemma" by rapper Nelly featuring Kelly Rowland. Next week the song dropped to number 12, and continued its descent ultimately staying for a total of 16 weeks on the chart. In September 2015, the song was certified silver by the British Phonographic Industry (BPI) for selling over 200,000 copies. It was listed as the 80th best selling single of 2002 in UK. The single was successful in Europe, reaching the top-ten of the charts in Austria, Belgium (both Flanders and Wallonia), Denmark, Finland, Germany, Greece, Netherlands, Norway, Sweden and Switzerland, while topping the charts in Italy and Spain. In Italy alone, the song spent 8 consecutive weeks at the top of the Musica e dischi charts. In France the song achieved gold certification from the Syndicat National de l'Édition Phonographique (SNEP) for shipping 250,000 copies of the single. Across the pan-European Hot 100 Singles, the song debuted and peaked at number three.

Music video

Development

The music video was directed by Traktor, a Swedish directing team known for several TV advertisements. It was filmed from August 22–27, 2002 at Hollywood Center Studios in Hollywood, California. The total production costs for the video was around $6.1 million ($ million in  dollars), making it the second most expensive music video ever made, after "Scream" by Michael Jackson and Janet Jackson. In an interview with Norwegian newspaper Dagbladet, Ole Sanders from Traktor recalled that in May 2002 Madonna sent them a handwritten letter, along with a demo version of "Die Another Day". The team was in Prague, shooting the music video for the Prodigy's single "Baby's Got a Temper". "We thought it was a joke, since the letter was long and handwritten. But the song sounded suspiciously like her," Sanders explained. He was then asked to go to Pinewood Studios in London to watch a half-finished version of the Bond film with producer Barbara Broccoli. Later, Sanders and one of his colleagues invited Madonna to their London home to discuss the video. By summer 2002, he had compiled the idea for the video with Madonna's inputs in it:
We received daily e-mails with feedback that was concise, unambiguous and occasionally entertaining. She works extremely hard with gumption and detail, and it was clear to us how she has remained on top for twenty years. It was no use being unprepared with vague ideas disguised as creativity, and there was no place to hide... First it felt like doing nonsense, then it's fun and it's something that's going to be seen. The project brings us into contact with interesting actors within both film and music.

The video was developed as an independent Madonna clip devoid of any footage from the Bond film, but was still Bond-inspired. It portrayed Madonna in a torture chamber as a prisoner and also fight sequences where the singer duels with herself. Post-production and visual effects for the video was done by London's Moving Picture Company (MPC). They created "invisible" effects for the fighting sequences, allowing Madonna to shoot two characters. Traktor explained that every shot of the video used some visual effects, co-ordinated by the group's lead artist, Christophe Allender. The directors did not want to use too many shots for the dueling scenes, which they believed would have restricted their creative freedom. Additional post-production effects included composing the fight sequence as a cohesive theme, adding blood to the wounds inflicted on Madonna, and adding digital stills of windows against the greenscreen where the shots were taken. The final shot showed the characteristic gun barrel sequence from the Bond films. MPC artist Ziggy Zigouras used a 2K resolution shot and tailored it according to Traktor's specifications. Finally, instead of grading the film print, MPC used the negatives to achieve crisper and cleaner images.

The premiere of the video took place on MTV channels worldwide on October 10, 2002, a first occurrence in the music channel's history. The music video was included in the enhanced CD of the single, along with the "Making of the video". In 2009, the video was included on Madonna's compilation, Celebration: The Video Collection.

Synopsis

The music video begins with a bruised Madonna being dragged by two soldiers through a dark corridor, and thrown against a chair in a torture chamber. She starts singing the first verse of the song as her captors laugh at her. An alternate scene shows two people fencing inside a white lit chamber, one in black clothes and one in white. Madonna continues groping with the different objects in the torture chamber and dancing. As she repeats the words "Sigmund Freud", the soldiers catch her again and douse her head in icy-water.

The two people fencing take off their masks, which reveal them to be Madonna and her doppelgänger surprised to see each other; they resume their violent fighting. The black Madonna slices across the white Madonna's stomach, which is mirrored in the imprisoned Madonna's stomach in the chamber. She rides on a hanging chain from the ceiling and smashes a mirror across the wall. The black Madonna breaks open a dark room by throwing the white Madonna against the wall. Different artifacts from the Bond films are present in the room and the two Madonna's fight through them. Meanwhile, the Madonna in the torture chamber wears phylacteries around her arm while hiding behind an electric chair.

As the breakdown happens, the soldiers bind her on the chair but she laughs, kicks and spits on them. Midst the aggressive fighting, the white Madonna takes a speargun and shoots the black Madonna squarely on the chest. The black Madonna falls down and concurrently a soldier pulls the switch on the electric chair. They laugh loudly thinking Madonna to be burnt but as the smoke clears, they see that no remnants are to be found. They rush to inspect the chair closely and notice three letters (לאו) being burnt in the chair. They scratch their head and see a vision of a bearded man laughing at them. Madonna is shown running from the torture chamber and opens the door, as the video ends with the gun barrel sequence.

Unlike many theme songs from movies, the video doesn't incorporate any movie footage into it.

Reception and analysis
According to author Santiago Fouz-Hernández, the video employed an identity-splitting strategy in which the two Madonnas fight each other. With this she was referencing her previous videos where such tactics have been employed, like the one for "Music", "Papa Don't Preach" and "Human Nature". Joanna Rydzewska, one of the authors of the book Representing Gender In Cultures analyzed that the violent imagery in the video was Madonna's way of portraying the violence she had faced during her "tumultuous" marriage with actor Sean Penn; she added that the video was a contrast to the "tremendously independent artist she is". The end of the video sparked discussion about the words imprinted on the electric chair, a phrase that can be interpreted as "great escape" or "freedom". According to The Sydney Morning Herald, some scholars of Judaism were riled by the Jewish religious texts and objects appearing in the video. One of Madonna's Kabbalah advisors, Michael Berg, explained that "Hebrew letters Madonna displays, lamed, aleph, vov—roughly equivalent to L, A, V—form one of the 72 names of God and denote a diminishing of the ego to connect with joy and fulfillment." According to him, donning tefillin represented "diminution of the desire to receive and a strengthening of the desire to share. But for a woman to don tefillin is still not a common practice, and for a gentile to wear tefillin might be regarded by some Jews as sacrilege."

In 2004, the singer was to visit Israel regarding her Kabbalah practice. However, ultra-orthodox Jews protested her trip, saying that Madonna disgraced the religion with her portrayal of wearing phylacteries/tefillin over her arm—a Jewish custom usually reserved for men—in the music video. Israeli securities had advised the singer not to make the trip, but the singer continued her visit to the graves of Jewish sages as well as shrines such as Rachel's Tomb on the edge of Bethlehem, traditional burial place of the biblical matriarch Rachel. "Die Another Day" was nominated for Best Video from a Film at the 2003 MTV Video Music Awards, but lost. It won the "Soundtrack Video of the Year" trophy at the 2003 MVPA Awards.

Live performances

Initial reports by The Observer suggested that Madonna would perform "Die Another Day" in front of Queen Elizabeth II at the premiere of the film in London's Royal Albert Hall, but it did not happen. It was not until two years later that she first performed "Die Another Day", as part of her 2004 Re-Invention World Tour. The song was to be included as the final performance in the set list, but "Holiday" was chosen instead and "Die Another Day" was included in the third segment of the show. Wearing a circus-themed corset designed by Chanel, she and her dancers performed a Tango-like choreography to the song, while backdrops displayed an old man in his deathbed. The performance was received favorably by Joan Anderman of The Boston Globe, who explained that "the abstract ballroom choreography of 'Die Another Day' was an elegant antidote to the rote gyrations favored by the next generation of pop stars." Towards the end of the performance, Madonna's dancers tied the singer on an electric chair and as it was raised high above the stage, she started singing "Lament" from Evita. The performance of "Die Another Day" was included on Madonna's documentary live album I'm Going to Tell You a Secret (2006), which chronicled the tour.

Four years later, "Die Another Day" was added to the set list of the 2008-09 Sticky & Sweet Tour, where it was used as a video interlude. It featured Madonna as a boxer on screen, while two of her dancers performed a faux boxing match. The video also showed Madonna in a technical knockout match, spraying her blood across the screen. Madonna's DJ Enferno remixed the song and the performance ended with the singer falling down on the ground in the video, as she emerged from beneath the stage while jump-roping. Paul Schrodt from Slant Magazine felt that the video emphasized the singer's "already-muscular arms", adding that "[u]nlike your run-of-the-mill diva, Madonna is willing to get dirty for her art, and she sometimes gets lost in her backup dancers' routine, though she's quick to remind the audience, 'I'm still the one in control'". Ben Kaplan from Canada.com noted that "Die Another Day", along with the performances of "4 Minutes" and "La Isla Bonita" are re-imagined as "parts of larger medleys, with Madonna giving shout-outs to techno, flamenco and old-school R&B influences". This performance was included on the Sticky & Sweet Tour live CD and DVD release, recorded during Madonna's shows in Buenos Aires, Argentina, in December 2008.

On July 26, 2012, while on The MDNA Tour, Madonna performed an exclusive club date at L'Olympia in Paris for only 2,700 fans and mixed "Die Another Day" with the song "Beautiful Killer" from her twelfth studio album MDNA. After finishing the performance of "Human Nature", Madonna wears a coat and as the opening music of "Die Another Day" starts, she wields a gun and launches into "Beautiful Killer". Excerpts of films by French actor Alain Delon—the main inspiration behind "Beautiful Killer"—were shown in the back drops.

Track listing and formats

UK / US 2 × 12" promo vinyl 
 A "Die Another Day" (Dirty Vegas Main Mix) – 10:08
 B1 "Die Another Day" (Thee RetroLectro Mix) – 6:59
 B2 "Die Another Day" (Deepsky Remix) – 7:27
 C "Die Another Day" (Thunderpuss Club Mix) – 9:25
 D "Die Another Day" (Thee Die Another Dub) – 8:26

UK / US / EU 2 × 12" vinyl
 A "Die Another Day" (Dirty Vegas Main Mix) – 10:08
 B "Die Another Day" (Thunderpuss Club Mix) – 9:25
 C1 "Die Another Day" (Thee RetroLectro Mix) – 6:59
 C2 "Die Another Day" (Deepsky Remix) – 7:27
 D "Die Another Day" (Dirty Vegas Dub) – 9:10

US 7" vinyl
 A "Die Another Day" (Radio Edit) – 3:27
 B "Die Another Day" (Album Version) – 4:38

US CD single
 "Die Another Day" (Radio Edit) – 3:27
 "Die Another Day" (Dirty Vegas Main Mix) – 10:08

EU CD single
 "Die Another Day" (Radio Edit) – 3:27
 "Die Another Day" (Thunderpuss Club Mix) – 9:25
 "Die Another Day" (Thee RetroLectro Mix) – 6:59

US / EU / AU / JAP Maxi CD Single
 "Die Another Day" (Radio Edit) – 3:27
 "Die Another Day" (Dirty Vegas Main Mix) – 10:08
 "Die Another Day" (Thee RetroLectro Mix) – 6:59
 "Die Another Day" (Thunderpuss Club Mix) – 9:25
 "Die Another Day" (Deepsky Remix) – 7:27
 "Die Another Day" (Brother Brown's Bond-Age Club) – 7:51

GER / AU CD single
 "Die Another Day" (Radio Edit) – 3:27
 "Die Another Day" (Dirty Vegas Main Mix) – 10:08
 "Die Another Day" (Deep Sky Edit) – 4:06

Credits and personnel
Credits for "Die Another Day" are adapted from American Life and the single liner notes.
 Madonna – lead vocals, background vocals, songwriter, producer
 Mirwais Ahmadzaï – songwriter, producer, programming
 Tim Young – audio mastering at Metropolis Studios, London
 Mark "Spike" Stent – audio mixing at Olympic Studios and Westlake Audio
 Michel Colombier – strings arrangement
 Geoff Foster – strings engineer at AIR Lyndhurst Studios, London
 Tom Hannen – assistant engineer
 Simon Changer – assistant engineer
 Tim Lambert – assistant engineer
 Mert and Marcus – photography
 Frank Maddocks – art direction, design

Charts

Weekly charts

Year-end charts

Decade-end charts

Certifications and sales

See also
 Outline of James Bond
 List of most expensive music videos
 List of number-one singles of 2002 (Canada)
 List of number-one hits of 2002 (Italy)
 List of number-one singles of 2000s in Romania
 List of number-one singles of 2002 (Spain)
 List of number-one dance singles of 2002 (U.S.)
 List of Romanian Top 100 number ones of the 2000s
 List of Madonna tribute albums

References

Bibliography

 
 
 
 
 
 

2002 singles
2002 songs
Canadian Singles Chart number-one singles
Electroclash songs
Madonna songs
Music video controversies
Number-one singles in Italy
Number-one singles in Portugal
Number-one singles in Romania
Number-one singles in Spain
Religious controversies in music
Song recordings produced by Madonna
Song recordings produced by Mirwais Ahmadzaï
Songs from James Bond films
Songs written by Madonna
Songs written by Mirwais Ahmadzaï
Warner Records singles